Joseph Ludlow (born 22 August 1997) is an English cricketer. He made his first-class debut on 1 April 2018 for Cardiff MCCU against Gloucestershire as part of the Marylebone Cricket Club University fixtures.

References

External links
 

1997 births
Living people
English cricketers
Cardiff MCCU cricketers
Bedfordshire cricketers
People educated at Hurstpierpoint College
Alumni of Cardiff University
People from Sidcup